The Ancient Commentators on Aristotle project based at King's College London and under the direction of Richard Sorabji has undertaken to translate into English the ancient commentaries on Aristotle. The project began in 1987 and in 2012 published its 100th volume. A further 30 or so volumes are planned. The project is now co-edited by Michael Griffin (UBC).

See also
 Commentaria in Aristotelem Graeca

External links
  Ancient Commentators Project at King's College London
 
 The Aristotelian Commentators: A Bibliographical Guide (PDF) by John Sellars